Antoine Choueiri Stadium is an indoor arena located in Ghazir, Lebanon. The arena has a capacity of between 4,500 and 5,000 spectators. It hosts indoor sporting events such as basketball, volleyball and has hosted the home matches of Club Sagesse Beirut. The stadium bears the colors of Sagesse and also hosts Ghazir Club basketball games and other volleyball matches. It also hosted the 1999 and 2000 ABC/FIBA Asia Champions Cup, the Lebanese Basketball League and cup, the Lebanese Volleyball League, and the 2010 FIBA Asia Stanković Cup.

External links
Stadium information

Indoor arenas in Lebanon
Basketball venues in Lebanon
Volleyball venues in Lebanon